Nicky Jam Hits or simply Hits is the compilation album by American singer Nicky Jam,  released on September 9, 2014. This album contains six songs and two remixes which were recorded and released between 2011 and 2014.

Track listing

References

2014 albums
Nicky Jam albums